Menkea is a genus of flowering plants belonging to the family Brassicaceae.

It is native to Australia.

The genus name of Menkea is in honour of Karl Theodor Menke (1791–1861), a German malacologist and balneologist who was a native of Bremen. He is remembered for his research on snails. It was first described and published in Index Seminum (HBG, Hamburgensis) 1843 on page 8 in 1843.

Known species
According to Kew:
Menkea australis 
Menkea crassa 
Menkea draboides 
Menkea lutea 
Menkea sphaerocarpa 
Menkea villosula

References

Brassicaceae
Brassicaceae genera
Plants described in 1843
Flora of Australia